Cordova Township may refer to the following townships in the United States:

 Cordova Township, Rock Island County, Illinois
 Cordova Township, Le Sueur County, Minnesota